Algarkirk is a village and civil parish in the Borough of Boston in Lincolnshire, England. It has a population of 406, falling to 386 at the 2011 census. An alternative village spelling is 'Algakirk'.

History
Before the Roman conquest the area was home to the Coritani; after Roman departure it became part of the Anglo Saxon kingdom of Mercia. Algarkirk has been claimed to be named after Ælfgar, Earl of Mercia, a son of Lady Godiva; he is reputedly buried in the graveyard of the parish church of St Peter and St Paul. The "kirk" element of the name comes from the Old English "circe" meaning church, which was later replaced by the Old Norse "kirk".

The 9th-century church itself is Early English and Norman with a double-aisle transept and a font of Purbeck marble. Under the tower are kneeling brass effigies of Nicholas Robertson (d. 1498), Merchant of the Staple of Calais, and his two wives Alice and Isabella. In 1492, he and Isabella glazed the church clerestorey. The church was heavily restored in 1851.

Hitherto, the parish had formed part of Boston Rural District, in the Parts of Holland. Holland was one of the three divisions (formally known as parts) of the traditional county of Lincolnshire. Since the Local Government Act of 1888, Holland had been, in most respects, a county in itself until the creation of Lincolnshire County Council in April 1974 by the combination of Holland, Lindsey (except for those areas transferred to Humberside) and Kesteven County Councils.

The Algarkirk Woad mill closed down after the 1932 crop. The mill owner was Mr George Nussey Snr.

Demography 
The population was recorded as 386 in the 2011 Census, a drop from 406 on the 2001 Census.

Geography
The village was once served by Algarkirk and Sutterton railway station on the now-closed line connecting Boston and Spalding. The A16 has been rebuilt on the former railway, so Algarkirk village lies between this and the old road, now the B1397. The Boston-Algarkirk Diversion opened in October 1991. The village primary school, the Fourfields school, is shared with Sutterton.

The village lies hard against the parish boundary with Sutterton, so that the two parish churches are six or seven hundred metres apart. While most of the parishes in Holland are more or less long and narrow so as to include both saltmarsh and fen, this was originally achieved in Algarkirk by having a detached fen about 12 kilometres away, in Holland Fen. This is now part of Amber Hill parish and ward.

It constitutes part of Five Villages electoral ward, one of eighteen rural wards in the borough, each comprising one or more parishes.

References

Further reading
"Peculiarities of a Vicar - A Remarkable Interview" paperspast.natlib.govt.nz - Hawera & Normanby Star p. 3; 16 February 1907. Retrieved 25 April 2011

External links

Villages in Lincolnshire
Civil parishes in Lincolnshire
Borough of Boston